Beetlejuice is a 1988 American fantasy horror comedy film directed by Tim Burton, written by Michael McDowell, Larry Wilson, and Warren Skaaren, produced by The Geffen Company, distributed by Warner Bros., and starring Alec Baldwin, Geena Davis, Jeffrey Jones, Catherine O'Hara, Winona Ryder, and Michael Keaton as the titular character. The plot revolves around a recently deceased couple who, as ghosts haunting their former home, contact Beetlejuice, an obnoxious and devious "bio-exorcist" from the Netherworld, to scare away the house's new inhabitants.

Beetlejuice was a critical and commercial success, grossing US$74.7 million from a budget of US$15 million. It won the Academy Award for Best Makeup and three Saturn Awards: Best Horror Film, Best Makeup, and Best Supporting Actress for Sylvia Sidney. The film's success spawned an animated television series, video games, and a 2018 stage musical. A sequel is currently in development.

Plot 

In Winter River, Connecticut, Barbara and Adam Maitland decide to spend their vacation decorating their idyllic country home. As they are driving home from a trip to town, Barbara swerves to avoid a dog and the car plunges into the river. After returning home, she and Adam notice they now lack reflections and find a Handbook for the Recently Deceased.

They begin to suspect they did not survive the car accident. When Adam attempts to leave the house, he ends up in a strange and otherworldly desert-like landscape populated by enormous sandworms. The encounter lasts only a few seconds for him but after being rescued by Barbara, she claims that he was gone for two hours.

The house is sold and the new owners, the Deetz family, arrive from New York City. Charles Deetz is a former real estate developer; his second wife Delia is a self-proclaimed sculptor; and his teenage goth daughter Lydia, from his first marriage, is an aspiring photographer. Under the guidance of interior designer Otho, the family transforms the house into a pastel-toned work of modern art.

Consulting the Handbook, the Maitlands travel to an otherworldly waiting room populated by other distressed souls where they discover the afterlife is structured according to a complex bureaucracy involving vouchers and caseworkers. The Maitlands' caseworker Juno informs them they must remain in the house for the next one hundred and twenty five years on pain of a dire fate. If they want the Deetzes out of the house, it is up to them to scare them away.

Although Adam and Barbara remain invisible to Charles and Delia, Lydia can see the ghost couple and befriends them. Against Juno's advice, the Maitlands contact the miscreant Beetlejuice, Juno's former assistant and a now freelance "bio-exorcist", to scare away the Deetzes. At first, they are unaware his name is pronounced "Beetlejuice", which is why they have such difficulty pronouncing it and thereby summoning him.

However, Beetlejuice quickly offends the Maitlands with his crude and morbid demeanor: they reconsider hiring him, though too late to stop him from wreaking havoc on the Deetzes. The small town's charm and the supernatural events inspire Charles to pitch his boss Maxie Dean on transforming the town into a tourist hot spot, but Maxie wants proof of the ghosts. Using the Handbook for the Recently Deceased, Otho conducts what he thinks is a séance and summons Adam and Barbara, using their wedding clothes, but they begin to age and decay as Otho had unwittingly performed an exorcism instead.

Horrified, Lydia summons Beetlejuice for help; but he will only help her on the condition that she marries him, enabling him to freely cause chaos in the mortal world. He saves the Maitlands and disposes of Maxie, his wife, and Otho, then prepares a wedding before a ghastly minister. The Maitlands intervene before the ceremony is completed, with Barbara riding a sandworm through the house to devour Beetlejuice.

Finally, the Deetzes and Maitlands agree to live in harmony within the house. Beetlejuice is stuck in the after-life waiting room. He stole a number ticket from a witch doctor who shrinks his head.

Cast

Production

Development 
Following the financial success of Pee-wee's Big Adventure (1985) Tim Burton became a "bankable" director and began working on a script for Batman with Sam Hamm. While Warner Bros. was willing to pay for the script's development, they were less willing to green-light Batman. Burton had become disheartened by the lack of imagination and originality in the scripts that had been sent to him, particularly Hot to Trot. David Geffen handed Burton the script for Beetlejuice, written by Michael McDowell (who wrote the script for "The Jar", an episode of Alfred Hitchcock Presents directed by Burton).

Larry Wilson was brought on board to continue rewriting work with McDowell, though Burton replaced McDowell and Wilson with Skaaren due to creative differences. Burton's original choice for Beetlejuice was Sammy Davis Jr. The producers also considered Dudley Moore and Sam Kinison for the role; but Geffen suggested Keaton. Burton was unfamiliar with Keaton's work, but was quickly convinced. The role of Lydia Deetz was auditioned for by several actresses such as Sarah Jessica Parker, Brooke Shields, Lori Loughlin, Diane Lane, Justine Bateman, Molly Ringwald, Juliette Lewis and Jennifer Connelly. Alyssa Milano was the runner-up for the role of Lydia Deetz. Burton cast Ryder upon seeing her in Lucas. Anjelica Huston was originally cast as Delia Deetz but then later dropped out due to illness. O'Hara quickly signed on, while Burton claimed it took a lot of time to convince other cast members to sign, as "they didn't know what to think of the weird script."

Beetlejuices budget was US$15 million, with just US$1 million given over to visual effects work. Considering the scale and scope of the effects, which included stop motion, replacement animation, prosthetic makeup, puppetry and blue screen, it was always Burton's intention to make the style similar to the B movies he grew up with as a child. "I wanted to make them look cheap and purposely fake-looking", Burton remarked. Burton had wanted to hire Anton Furst as production designer after being impressed with his work on The Company of Wolves (1984) and Full Metal Jacket (1987), though Furst was committed to High Spirits, a choice he later regretted. He hired Bo Welch, his future collaborator on Edward Scissorhands (1990) and Batman Returns (1992). The test screenings were met with positive feedback and prompted Burton to film an epilogue featuring Betelgeuse foolishly angering a witch doctor. Warner Bros. disliked the title Beetlejuice and wanted to call the film House Ghosts. As a joke, Burton suggested the name Scared Sheetless and was horrified when the studio actually considered using it. Exterior shots were filmed in East Corinth, Vermont.

Writing 
McDowell's original script is far less comedic and much darker; the Maitlands' car crash is depicted graphically, with Barbara's arm being crushed and the couple screaming for help as they slowly drown in the river. A reference to this remained, as Barbara remarks that her arm feels frozen upon returning home as a ghost. Instead of possessing the Deetzes and forcing them to dance during dinner, the Maitlands cause a vine-patterned carpet to come to life and attack the Deetzes by tangling them to their chairs.

The character of Betelgeuse—envisioned by McDowell as a winged demon, who takes on the form of a short Middle Eastern man–is also intent on killing the Deetzes rather than scaring them, and wanted sex from Lydia instead of wanting to marry her. In this version of the script, Betelgeuse only needs to be exhumed from his grave to be summoned, after which he is free to wreak havoc; he cannot be summoned or controlled by saying his name three times, and wanders the world freely, appearing to torment different characters in different manifestations. McDowell's script also featured a second Deetz child, nine-year-old Cathy, the only person able to see the Maitlands and the subject of Betelgeuse's homicidal wrath in the film's climax, during which he mutilates her while in the form of a rabid squirrel before revealing his true form.

In another version of the script, the film was to have concluded with the Maitlands, Deetzes, and Otho conducting an exorcism ritual that destroys Betelgeuse, and the Maitlands transforming into miniature versions of themselves and moving into Adam's model of their home, which they refurbish to look like their house before the Deetzes moved in.

Co-author and producer Larry Wilson has talked about the negative reaction to McDowell's original script at Universal where he was employed at the time:

Skaaren's rewrite drastically shifted the film's tone, eliminating the graphic nature of the Maitlands' deaths while depicting the afterlife as a complex bureaucracy. Skaaren's rewrite also altered McDowell's depiction of the limbo that keeps Barbara and Adam trapped inside of their home; in McDowell's script, it takes the form of a massive void filled with giant clock gears that shred the fabric of time and space as they move. Skaaren had Barbara and Adam encounter different limbos every time they leave their home, including the "clock world", and the Sandworm's world, identified as Saturn's moon Titan. Skaaren also introduced the leitmotif of music accompanying Barbara and Adam's ghostly hijinks, although his script specified R&B tunes instead of Harry Belafonte, and was to have concluded with Lydia dancing to "When a Man Loves a Woman".

Skaaren's first draft retained some of the more sinister characteristics of McDowell's Betelgeuse, but toned down the character to make him a troublesome pervert rather than blatantly murderous. Betelgeuse's true form was that of the Middle Eastern man, and much of his dialogue was written in African-American Vernacular English. This version concluded with the Deetzes returning to New York and leaving Lydia in the care of the Maitlands, who, with Lydia's help, transform the exterior of their home into a stereotypical haunted house while returning the interior to its previous state. It also would have featured deleted scenes such as the real-estate agent, Jane, trying to convince the Deetzes to allow her to sell the house for them (having sold it to them in the first place—Charles and Delia decline), and a revelation on how Beetlejuice had died centuries earlier (that he had attempted to hang himself while drunk, only to mess it up and died slowly choking to death, rather than quickly by snapping his neck) and wound-up working for Juno before striking it out on his own as a "free-lance Bio-Exorcist".

Retrospectively, McDowell was impressed at how many people made the connection between the film's title and the star Betelgeuse. He added that the writers and producers had received a suggestion the sequel be named Sanduleak -69 202 after the former star of SN 1987A.

Filming 
While the setting is the fictional village of Winter River, Connecticut, all outdoor scenes were filmed in East Corinth, a village in the town of Corinth, Vermont. Interiors were filmed at The Culver Studios in Culver City, California. Principal photography began on March 11, 1987.

Soundtrack 

The Beetlejuice soundtrack, first released in 1988 on LP, CD, and cassette tape, features most of the score (written and arranged by Danny Elfman) from the film. Geffen reissued the original 1988 soundtrack on vinyl in 2015, which was later re-mastered and pressed to vinyl by Waxwork Records in 2019 for the 30th anniversary of Beetlejuice. The soundtrack features two original recordings performed by Harry Belafonte used in the film: "Day-O (The Banana Boat Song)" and "Jump in the Line (Shake, Senora)". Two other vintage Belafonte recordings that appeared in the film are absent from the soundtrack: "Man Smart, Woman Smarter" and "Sweetheart from Venezuela". The soundtrack entered the Billboard 200 albums chart the week ending June 25, 1988, at No. 145, peaking two weeks later at No. 118 and spending a total of six weeks on the chart. This was after the film had already fallen out of the top 10 and before the video release later in October. "Day-O" received a fair amount of airplay at the time in support of the soundtrack.

The complete score (with the Belafonte tracks included) was released in both the DVD and the Blu-ray as an isolated music track in the audio settings menu; this version of the audio track consists entirely of "clean" musical cues, uninterrupted by dialogue or sound effects.

Reception

Box office 
Beetlejuice opened theatrically in the United States on March 30, 1988, earning US$8,030,897 in its opening weekend. The film eventually grossed US$74,664,632 in North America. Beetlejuice was a financial success, recouping its US$15 million budget, and was the 10th-highest grossing film of 1988.

Critical response 
Beetlejuice was met with a mostly positive response. The website's critical consensus reads, "Brilliantly bizarre and overflowing with ideas, Beetlejuice offers some of Michael Keaton's most deliciously manic work - and creepy, funny fun for the whole family." On Metacritic, the film has a weighted average score of 70 out of 100, based on 18 reviews. Audiences surveyed by CinemaScore gave the film a B on a grade scale of A to F.

Pauline Kael referred to the film as a "comedy classic", while Jonathan Rosenbaum of Chicago Reader gave a highly positive review. Rosenbaum felt Beetlejuice carried originality and creativity that did not exist in other films. Vincent Canby of The New York Times called it "a farce for our time" and wished Keaton could have received more screen time. Desson Howe of The Washington Post felt Beetlejuice had "the perfect balance of bizarreness, comedy and horror".

Janet Maslin of The New York Times gave the film a negative review, stating that the film "tries anything and everything for effect, and only occasionally manages something marginally funny" and "is about as funny as a shrunken head". Roger Ebert gave the film two out of four stars, writing that he "would have been more interested if the screenplay had preserved their [Alec Baldwin and Geena Davis] sweet romanticism and cut back on the slapstick". For Keaton's character, Ebert called him "unrecognizable behind pounds of makeup" and stated that "his scenes don't seem to fit with the other action".

In his book Comedy-Horror Films: A Chronological History, 1914-2008, Bruce G. Hallenbeck praised the film's lively script, assured direction, off-beat casting, and "delightfully off-kilter, Edward Gorey-like look", citing the explorer with the shrunken head and the animated sandworm as particularly memorable visuals.

Accolades 
At the 61st Academy Awards, Beetlejuice won the Academy Award for Best Makeup, (Steve La Porte, Ve Neill and Robert Short.)  while the British Academy of Film and Television Arts nominated the film with Best Visual Effects and Makeup at the 42nd British Academy Film Awards.

Beetlejuice won Best Horror Film and Best Make-up at the 1988 Saturn Awards. Sidney also won the Saturn for Best Supporting Actress for her performance as Juno, and the film received five other nominations: Direction for Burton, Writing for McDowell and Skaaren, Best Supporting Actor for Keaton, Music for Elfman and Special Effects. Beetlejuice was nominated for the Hugo Award for Best Dramatic Presentation. Beetlejuice was 88th in the American Film Institute's list of Best Comedies.

Sequel 
In 1990, Burton hired Jonathan Gems to write a sequel titled Beetlejuice Goes Hawaiian. "Tim thought it would be funny to match the surfing backdrop of a beach movie with some sort of German Expressionism, because they're totally wrong together," Gems said. The story followed the Deetz family moving to Hawaii, where Charles is developing a resort. They soon discover that his company is building on the burial ground of an ancient Hawaiian Kahuna. The spirit comes back from the afterlife to cause trouble, and Beetlejuice becomes a hero by winning a surf contest with magic. Keaton and Ryder agreed to do the film, on the condition that Burton directed, but both he and Keaton became distracted with Batman Returns.

Burton was still interested in Beetlejuice Goes Hawaiian in early 1991. Impressed with Daniel Waters' work on Heathers, Burton approached him for a rewrite. However, he eventually signed Waters to write the script for Batman Returns. By August 1993, producer David Geffen hired Pamela Norris (Troop Beverly Hills, Saturday Night Live) to rewrite. Warner Bros. approached Kevin Smith in 1996 to rewrite the script, though Smith turned down the offer in favor of Superman Lives. Smith later joked that his response was "Didn't we say all we needed to say in the first Beetlejuice? Must we go tropical?"

In March 1997, Gems released a statement saying "The Beetlejuice Goes Hawaiian script is still owned by The Geffen Company and it will likely never get made. You really couldn't do it now anyway. Winona is too old for the role, and the only way they could make it would be to totally recast it."

In September 2011, Warner Bros. hired Seth Grahame-Smith, who collaborated with Burton on Dark Shadows and Abraham Lincoln: Vampire Hunter, to write and produce a sequel to Beetlejuice. Grahame-Smith signed on with the intention of doing "a story that is worthy of us actually doing this for real, something that is not just about cashing in, is not just about forcing a remake or a reboot down someone's throat." He was also adamant that Keaton would return and that Warner Bros. would not recast the role. Burton and Keaton had not officially signed on but would have returned if the script was good enough. Grahame-Smith met with Keaton in February 2012, "We talked for a couple of hours and talked about big picture stuff. It's a priority for Warner Bros. It's a priority for Tim. [Michael's] been wanting to do it for 20 years and he'll talk to anybody about it who will listen." The story was set in a real time frame from 1988; "This will be a true 26 or 27 years later sequel. What's great is that for Beetlejuice , time means nothing in the afterlife, but the world outside is a different story."

In November 2013, Ryder hinted at a possible return for the sequel as well by saying, "I'm kind of sworn to secrecy but it sounds like it might be happening. It's 27 years later. And I have to say, I love Lydia Deetz so much. She was such a huge part of me. I would be really interested in what she is doing 27 years later." Ryder confirmed that she would only consider making a sequel if Burton and Keaton were involved. In December 2014, Burton stated, "It's a character that I love and I miss actually working with Michael. There's only one Betelgeuse. We're working on a script and I think it's probably closer than ever and I'd love to work with him again." In January 2015, writer Grahame-Smith told Entertainment Weekly that the script was finished and that he and Burton intended to start filming Beetlejuice 2 by the end of the year, and that both Keaton and Ryder would return in their respective roles. In August 2015, on Late Night with Seth Meyers, Ryder confirmed she would be reprising her role in the sequel. In May 2016, Burton stated, "It's something that I really would like to do in the right circumstances, but it's one of those films where it has to be right. It's not a kind of a movie that cries out [for a sequel], it's not the Beetlejuice trilogy. So it's something that if the elements are right—because I do love the character and Michael's amazing as that character, so yeah we'll see. But there's nothing concrete yet." In October 2017, Mike Vukadinovich was hired to re-write the script. In April 2019, Warner Bros. stated the sequel had been shelved.

In February 2022, a sequel was announced again, this time produced by Plan B Entertainment alongside Warner Bros. with Keaton and Ryder reprising their roles. Principal photography was scheduled to begin that same year. Burton stated in October 2022 that he was not involved in the project, but backtracked days later, saying "nothing is out of the question."

In March 2023, reports began to circulate that Jenna Ortega was circling a role in the film, potentially as Lydia's daughter. Burton and Keaton are expected to return with a potential start date in the summer.

In other media

Animated series 

Due to the film's financial success, a Beetlejuice animated television series was created for ABC. The series ran for four seasons (the final season airing on Fox), lasting from September 9, 1989, to December 6, 1991. Burton served as the show's developer and executive producer.

The character of Beetlejuice was later prominently featured in the Teen Titans Go! episode "Ghost with the Most," which aired in October 2020 as part of the show's sixth season. In this appearance, he was voiced by Alex Brightman, reprising his role from the Broadway musical.

Video games 
 Adventures of Beetlejuice: Skeletons in the Closet is a video game released for MS-DOS in 1990.
 Beetlejuice is a video game developed by Rare and released for the Nintendo Entertainment System in 1991.
 Beetlejuice: Horrific Hijinx from the Neitherworld! is a video game created by Rare and published by LJN for the Nintendo Game Boy. It is based on the animated series.
 A Beetlejuice-themed fun pack for the toys-to-life video game Lego Dimensions was released on September 12, 2017. The pack includes a Beetlejuice minifigure and constructable Saturn's Sandworm, and adds a Beetlejuice-themed open-world area and battle arena to the game. In the Beetlejuice-themed open-world area, Beetlejuice is voiced by Christopher Swindle, Adam Maitland is voiced by Jeff Shine, Barbara Maitland and Delia Dietz are voiced by Krizia Bajos, and Harry the Head-Shrunken Hunter is voiced by Tom Kane. Beetlejuice also features prominently in an episode of Teen Titans Go! included as part of the game. In the Teen Titans Go! episode, when the Titans travel to the Lego world, Raven manages to summon Beetlejuice by saying his name three times and she gets to go to the Beetlejuice world and Beetlejuice says if Raven wants to win the Lego building competition, she should resort to cheating and use magic. However, Beetlejuice actually tricks her into making a giant gargoyle that the Titans have to fight.

Stage musical 

In 2016, work began on a Broadway stage musical adaptation of the film directed by Alex Timbers, produced by Warner Bros., with music and lyrics by Eddie Perfect and the musical book written by Scott Brown and Anthony King. The musical was debuted by readings starring Christopher Fitzgerald with the second featuring Kris Kukul as musical director and Connor Gallagher as choreographer. The musical premiered its pre-Broadway tryout at the National Theatre in Washington, D.C. for a limited run from October 14 to November 18, 2018, with Alex Brightman in the title role.

In December 2019, the producers announced that the production would play its final performance at the Winter Garden on June 6, 2020, to make way for a revival of The Music Man starring Hugh Jackman and Sutton Foster.  The producers sought to find a theatre to transfer the show to, but the run was cut short when Broadway was shut down in March 2020 due to the COVID-19 pandemic.  Subsequent productions are set to open across the world, including a North American national tour. The show reopened at the Marquis Theatre on April 8, 2022.

See also 
 List of ghost films

References

External links 

 
 
 
 
 
 
 Official site for Beetlejuice's Rock and Roll Graveyard Revue

 
1988 films
1988 soundtrack albums
1980s black comedy films
1980s comedy horror films
1980s fantasy comedy films
1980s ghost films
1988 comedy films
American black comedy films
American comedy horror films
American fantasy comedy films
1988 fantasy films
American haunted house films
American dark fantasy films
1980s English-language films
Films scored by Danny Elfman
Films about exorcism
Films about the afterlife
Films adapted into television shows
Films using stop-motion animation
Films directed by Tim Burton
Films set in Connecticut
Films set in country houses
Films shot in Vermont
Films that won the Academy Award for Best Makeup
The Geffen Film Company films
Titan (moon) in film
Warner Bros. films
Films with screenplays by Larry Wilson (screenwriter)
Films with screenplays by Warren Skaaren
1980s American films